The William G. Kerckhoff Marine Laboratory is owned and operated by the California Institute of Technology (Caltech). It is located 101 Dahlia Street, in the Corona del Mar district of Newport Beach, in Orange County, California.

History 
The marine laboratory was established by biologist Thomas Hunt Morgan in 1928 to replicate the facilities at the Stazione Zoologica in Naples, Italy. Caltech made the decision to purchase the facility in 1929. It is one of the oldest marine laboratories on the West Coast of the United States. From 1962 until his death in 2002, Dr. Wheeler J. North conducted numerous studies on the ecology of the California kelp forests while based at this laboratory.  During the 1990s and 2000s investigators included members of the Eric Davidson lab working on various marine biology related projects. The current Director of the Kerckhoff Marine Lab is Prof. Victoria J. Orphan, who maintains an active research program there.

See also
Marine biology
Marine ecosystem

Notes

California Institute of Technology buildings and structures
Marine biological stations
Biological research institutes in the United States
Buildings and structures in Orange County, California
Newport Beach, California